Monument with Standing Beast is a sculpture by Jean Dubuffet in front of the Helmut Jahn designed James R. Thompson Center in the Loop community area of Chicago, Illinois.  Its location is across the street from Chicago City Hall to the South and diagonal across the street from the Daley Center to the southeast. It is a  white fiberglass work of art.  The piece is a 10-ton or  work.  It was unveiled on November 28, 1984.

This is one of Dubuffet's three monumental sculpture commissions in the United States. It has been taken to represent a standing animal, a tree, a portal and an architectural form.  The sculpture is based on Dubuffet's 1960 painting series Hourloupe.  The sculpture and the series of figural and landscape designs it is a part of reflects his thoughts of earliest monumental commission, for the One Chase Manhattan Plaza.

The sculpture is one of 19 commissioned artworks funded under the State of Illinois Art-in-Architecture Program throughout the building.  This was commissioned by the Capital Development Board of Illinois.

The sculpture is affectionately known to many Chicagoans as "Snoopy in a blender".

See also
 List of public art in Chicago
 Plop art

External links 

 Official Website

Notes 

1984 sculptures
Outdoor sculptures in Chicago
Fiberglass sculptures in Illinois